Pouteria torta is a species of tree native to Central and South America. The type subspecies Pouteria torta subsp. torta is found largely in the Brazilian cerrado and is most commonly called abiurana, abiu-piloso and cabo-de-machado (on account of its use in woodwork). The subspecies Pouteria torta subsp. tuberculata is distributed from Mexico to the Amazon, where it is known as red abiurana (abiorana-vermelha) on account of the ruddy pericarp of the fruit.

References

External links
 

torta
Flora of Brazil
Flora of the Cerrado
Trees of Brazil